This article lists the known monsters in Marvel Comics.

History
In the earlier parts of Marvel Comics, issues such as Journey into Mystery, Strange Tales, Tales of Suspense, and Tales to Astonish would detail stories of its different monsters. They consist of various monsters from mythologies (e.g., giants, e.g., cyclopes, trolls, ogres, etc., orcs, goblins, imps, undead, e.g., zombies, mummies, and vampires, etc., demons, ghouls, werewolves, werehyenas, werecats, and wererats, etc.), and novels (e.g., Frankenstein's Monster, and Mr Hyde, etc.), giant aliens, kaiju, Deviant Mutates (and even human and animal mutates/mutants), and experiments that went horribly wrong. In later Marvel Comics stories, some of the Monsters would later be seen inhabiting Monster Isle.

During the "Monsters Unleashed" storyline, the monsters in this category would be classified as Goliathons where they were summoned by the Inhuman Kei Kawade in order to help the superheroes fight the Leviathon Tide.

A-Bomb

Abominable Snowman
The Abominable Snowman is a large cryptid often found in the Himalayas.

Carl Hanson
The first Abominable Snowman (Carl Hanson) was created by Jack Kirby and Steve Ditko and first appeared in Tales to Astonish #13 (Nov. 1960).

Carl Hanson was a greedy explorer who had heard of the infamous Abominable Snowman. In order to capture the creature and make money off it, Hanson steals a cursed photograph. In the Himalayas, he was unable to get help in finding it as people constantly warned him to get rid of the cursed photograph before the curse overtakes him. As he progresses up the mountain, Carl's hair grows longer, his mind becomes addled, and he drops the picture as he becomes the Abominable Snowman.

Over time, the Abominable Snowman became an inhabitant on Monster Isle and supposedly grew bigger. He was among the monsters that witnessed the arrival of the X-Men members Shadowcat and Magik when they arrived to pick up a mutant girl named Bo. When Shadowcat and Magik found Bo, the Abominable Snowman and the other monsters attacked them until Magik teleported herself, Shadowcat, and Bo back to the Jean Grey School for Higher Learning.

During the "Monsters Unleashed" storyline, the Abominable Snowman was one of the many monsters summoned by Kid Kaiju and helped defeat the Leviathon Mother and its creatures.

Howling Commandos version
The second Abominable Snowman was created by Keith Giffen and Eduardo Francisco and first appeared in Nick Fury's Howling Commandos #2 (Jan. 2006). He is depicted as a member of the Howling Commandos and is capable of speech, albeit broken. He teamed up with the Sasquatch to track down Groot. He insulted Gorilla-Man by calling him less than a monkey on a bicycle at a zoo.

Abomination

Teen Abomination

Absorbing Man

Adversary

Aries

Anaconda

Amatsu-Mikaboshi

Anole

Anuxa
Anuxa is a giant monster who was first seen in Tales to Astonish #7 and was created by Stan Lee and Don Heck.

Anuxa was part of a monstrous alien race that sent him to Earth as a scout. When the dominant species of Earth has died out, Anuxa is to claim the Earth for his kind. 1,000,000 years later, Anuxa got impatient that humanity would survive the many disasters. Upon hearing of the atomic bomb, Anuxa went back into the iceberg that he was using as a hiding place and continued to bide his time for the day when the atomic bombs would wipe out humanity.

Apocalypse

Armadillo

Asp

Azazel

Badoon

Batragon
Batragon is a giant bat/dragon monster that was first seen in Godzilla #4 and was created by Doug Moench and Tom Sutton.

Batragon was once an ordinary bat that was transformed into a bat/dragon monster by a Lifestone that was wielded by Doctor Demonicus who then dispatched it to steal an oil tanker in order to use its oil to power his equipment. This attracted the attention of Godzilla who then fought Batragon at Doctor Demonicus' volcano lair and destroyed him.

Batwing

Behemoth
Behemoth is an Atlantean beast that first appeared in Tales to Astonish #77 and was created by Stan Lee, Adam Austin, and Bill Everett.

The Behemoth was an Atlantean beast that was created by the best Atlantean scientists in order to protect Atlantis from future threats. Behemoth appears in the Marvel Superheroes Show (1966) in the Namor Segment.

Belasco

Beta-Beast
Beta-Beast is a giant alien monster that first appeared in Godzilla #12 and was created by Doug Moench and Herb Trimpe.

The Beta-Beast is a giant alien monster that was captured and augmented by the Warlords of the planet Beta. As the Beta-Beast was not strong enough to deal with the Mega-Monsters used by the Megan warlords, the Betans moved their base to Earth's moon where they had it challenge Godzilla to see if it is worthy enough to fight the Mega-Monsters. The Beta-Beast was killed by Godzilla proving a point to the Betan Warlords that he might be a good challenge for the Mega-Monsters.

Beast

Dark Beast

Bi-Beast

Big Bertha

Black Spectre

Blackheart

Blackout

Blip
Blip is an electrical alien monster that first appeared in Tales to Astonish #15 and was created by Stan Lee, Jack Kirby, and Dick Ayers.

The Blip is a giant alien monster composed of electrical energies.

Blob

Bloodaxe

Bombu
Bombu is an alien monster that first appeared in Journey into Mystery #60 and was created by Stan Lee, Jack Kirby, and Dick Ayers.

Bombu is a giant alien conqueror from the planet Oobagon VIII who had conquered 275 worlds. The high commander of Oobagon VIII sent Bombu to Earth as part of a scouting mission for the Oobagonians. While subjugating the natives while operating as a witch doctor, Bombu's plan didn't go well when he was struck by lightning. The natives then pelted Bombu who then fled Earth.

Some years later, Bombu is sent back to Earth by his high commander in order to get Earth ready for an Oobagonian invasion. While manifesting in an unnamed American city, Bombu was confronted by the police who managed to taser him. Bombu was then arrested and incarcerated in a county jail. Though he did use his one telephone call to inform the high commander of his failure.

Bova

Brood

Brothers Grimm

Bruttu
Bruttu (also called the Brute That Walks) is a giant monster that first appeared in Tales of Suspense #22 and was created by Stan Lee, Jack Kirby, and Dick Ayers.

Howard Lindley was a short scientist who had been picked on for his size. When an atomic machine tapped into Howard's imagination, it transformed him into the comic book creature Bruttu. When he burst through the wall, he was unable to speak due to his now-monstrous vocal cords only producing monster sounds. While evading the military and learning that Anne Benson secretly loved him, Bruttu made his way back to the lab and thought of himself when he reactivated the machine. It was enough to turn Bruttu back into Howard Lindley. Afterwards, Howard destroyed the machines and professed his love to Anne Benson.

Bushmaster

Caliban

Carrion

Centurius

Ch'od

Charcoal

Clea

Cobra

Colossus

Constrictor

Copperhead

Cottonmouth

Crawling Creature
The Crawling Creature is a reptilian monster that first appeared in Tales to Astonish #22 and was created by Stan Lee and Jack Kirby.

The Crawling Creature is a reptilian monster that lived in the underground parts of the Grand Canyon where it menaced a lost tribe of cave people. While fleeing the Crawling Creature during a mining expedition, Walter Carter was saved by a passing helicopter.

Creature from the Black Bog
The Creature from the Black Bog is a giant alien monster that first appeared in Tales of Suspense #23 and was created by Stan Lee and Steve Ditko.

The Creature from the Black Bog is a peaceful alien explorer who landed on Earth to fix its engines and got stuck in the bog where he was unable to reach the vines. Sometime later, an elderly couple named John and Martha later found the Creature from the Black Bog and helped it escape from its murky prison. Before leaving Earth upon fixing his ship, the Creature from the Black Bog rewarded John and Martha by taking their memories and sprinkling it into the Fountain of Youth which restored them to their physical age.

D'Spayre

Darwin

Death

Death Adder

Deathwatch

Demogoblin

Demon Bear

Delphyne Gorgon

Devil Dinosaur

Devil Dinosaur is a red Tyrannosaurus that came from Dinosaur World.

Diamondback

Digger

Dinah Soar

Dire Wraith

Doctor Voodoo

Doorman

Doppelganger

Dormammu

Dragoom
Dragoom first appeared in Strange Tales #76 and was created by Stan Lee and Jack Kirby.

Dragoom is a giant fiery denizen of the Vulcan race who escaped prison from his home world and came to Earth with the intent of conquering the planet. However, Dragoom fled when he was deceived by the filmmaker Victor Cartwright into believing that there were other Vulcans on the planet.

Dweller-in-Darkness

Eel

Elektro

Elektro first appeared in Tales of Suspense #13 (Jan. 1961), in the seven-page story "Elektro" by writer-editor Stan Lee and penciler Jack Kirby. Elektro debuted in an issue of what fans and historians call pre-superhero Marvel comics, published by Marvel's 1950s and early 1960s predecessor, Atlas Comics.

Elektro was originally a supercomputer created by scientist Wilbur Poole. Calling itself Elektro and now armed with several dangerous weapons, the robot decides to conquer mankind and attacks the city of San Francisco.
Poole, however, recovers from the hypnotic trance and deactivates Elektro by accessing one of the robot's feet and removing a transistor.

Years later, Mister Fantastic wipes Elektro's flawed programming and replaces it. He then "enrolls" Elektro in his rehabilitation program, which involves Elektro being reduced to human size and stripped of his powers so as to allow him to enter human society. Elektro takes up a job as a mail attendant in the Fantastic Four's headquarters, the Baxter Building, and later joins his fellow rehab-program creatures, the extraterrestrials Fin Fang Foom, Googam and Gorgilla, to defeat the microscopic alien conqueror Tim Boo Baa. He also starts a relationship with Fantastic Four's robotic receptionist Roberta.

At some point, Elektro was arrested upon being mistaken for Electro and is imprisoned. Upon getting word of this, the robots at the Baxter Building saw the prison riot that Elektro was in. Elektro was later freed from prison when the confusion was cleared up.

Experiment 247
Experiment 247 first appeared in Tales to Astonish #1 and was created by Stan Lee and Jack Kirby.

Experiment 247 is a common snapping turtle that was given hormone regulator serum by Dr. Parker. It was trapped behind a wall until it was freed by the natives.

Fin Fang Foom

Fin Fang Foom is a Makulan, a dragon-like alien from the planet Kakaranthara.

Flux

Frankenstein's Monster

Galactus

Gargantua

Gargantus
Gargantus is a giant blue aquatic humanoid monster that appeared in Strange Tales #80 and #85.  A different Gargantus (Alien robot) is an enemy of Iron Man. He appeared in Tales of Suspense #40. A nightmare version of the alien robot Gargantus created by Count Nefaria (as Dream Master) appears in the Marvel Superheroes show (1966) in the Iron Man segment (Dream Master episode).

Gargoyle

Garokk

Ghost

Ghost Rider

Johnny Blaze

Cosmic Ghost Rider

Ghost Rider 2099

Danny Ketch

Noble Kale

Robbie Reyes

Gibbon

Giganto

There were two different Gigantos:

 The first one was a Deviant Mutate that dwells in Subterranea.
 The second one is an Atlantean beast that resembles a sperm whale with arms and legs.

Gigantus
Gigantus is a giant monster from the underwater city of Mu who first appeared in Tales to Astonish #63 and was created by Stan Lee and Jack Kirby.

Gigantus was sent by his king to invade the surface world. It retreated when a prop builder named Mr. Baxter built Ulvar to scare it back to Mu.

Glob

Glop
Glop is a giant monster that first appeared in Tales to Astonish #21 and was created by Steve Ditko. It was originally called "Hulk" before the Marvel Comics character of the same name came into being.

Glop is a giant monster that emerged from a movie screen that was playing the movie it was in.

Goblin King

Godzilla

Marvel Comics had its rendition of Godzilla.

Gog

Gog is a Tsiln.

Googam
Googam is a giant alien monster who is the son of Goom. First appeared in Tales of Suspense #17.

Goom
Goom is an alien from Planet X who attempted to conquer the Earth. He was defeated and returned to his home planet by other aliens from Planet X. His son Googam soon followed in his father's footsteps. Goom first appeared in Tales of Suspense #15 and was created by Stan Lee, Jack Kirby, and Dick Ayers.

Gorgilla

Gorgilla is a giant ape/human monster. He first appeared in Tales to Astonish #12 and was created by Stan Lee and Jack Kirby.

Gorgilla was originally a  half-man/half-ape native to the island of Borneo, who is discovered by an expedition seeking the "missing link" between man and apes. After Gorgilla saves the expedition from a dinosaur, a Tyrannosaurus rex, they in gratitude decide to leave the island and never mention Gorgilla.
 
Gorgilla, however, becomes curious about mankind and stows away on a ship bound for New York. Gorgilla stops an assassination attempt while in New York, but dies from a fall from the Statue of Liberty.
 
This is later corrected and it is revealed that the adventurer Doctor Druid talks Gorgilla down from the Statue of Liberty and ensures that he is returned to Borneo.
 
Gorgilla is among those summoned by Yandroth and influenced into attacking the Defenders. Gorgilla dropped a building on the Avengers, but is defeated by the Defenders.
 
Gorgilla is later deposited on Monster Isle by the Fantastic Four and eventually undergoes a rehabilitation program, which involves him being shrunken down to human size and hypnotically stripped of his powers so as to allow him to enter human society. Gorgilla takes up a job as a window cleaner at the Baxter Building and later joins fellow monsters Fin Fang Foom, Elektro, and Googam as part of the "Fin Fang Four" to defeat the microscopic alien conqueror Tim Boo Baa.
 
During the Monsters Unleashed storyline, Gorgilla, Fin Fang Foom, Green Thing, and Zzutak confront Kei Kawade in the forest outside his house where they caught him offguard.

Gorgolla

Gorgolla is an alien gargoyle monster that first appeared in Strange Tales #74 and was created by Jack Kirby and Dick Ayers.

Gorgolla is a Stonian from the planet Stonus V and the son of Granitor who ruled the Stonians. He led an invasion to Earth centuries ago and arranged for the Stonians to hide out as gargoyles, which they resembled. He was seemingly killed by the Stonian army when they were revived, as they had learned peace from observing humanity.
 
Upon hearing about what happened to Gorgolla, his father Granitor sent his legion of assassins to kill the Stonians responsible.
 
Gorgolla later turned up alive where he was actually taken into S.H.I.E.L.D. custody and placed in their Howling Commandos Monster Force as seen in the director's cut of the first issue.
 
At some point, Gorgolla relocated to Monster Isle. He was among the monsters that attacked Shadowcat and Magik when they came for a mutant girl named Bo. Not wanting to keep fighting Gorgolla and the rest of Monster Isle's inhabitants, Magik teleported herself, Kitty Pryde, and Bo back to the Jean Grey Institute for Higher Learning.

Gorilla Girl

Gorilla-Man

Gorr

Green Goblin

Ultimate Green Goblin

Green Thing
Green Thing is a monstrous weed monster that first appeared in Tales of Suspense #19 and was created by Stan Lee and Jack Kirby.

A botanist that developed a plant intelligence serum tested it on a weed which transformed into a giant weed monster with a human-shaped head where it planned to take over the world only for the botanist to use the same serum on the Ignatus Rex that destroyed the Green Thing.

Grey Gargoyle

Grey Goblin

Griffin

Grizzly

Grogg
Grogg is a fictional monster character from the Marvel Universe who first appeared in Strange Tales #83 (April 1961).

Grogg is a giant who possesses super-strength, can fly and also breathe flames. He lived below the surface of the former Soviet Union but was revived and freed by atomic bomb testing under Colonel Vorcutsky. Grogg pursued all those involved with testing and fought off communists. He then relocated to Earth's moon but later returned to Earth. Miklos Kozlov, a scientist/political prisoner sabotaged the Soviet's plan to build a military base on Mars by tricking Grogg into entering their ship, Kozlov escaped using a smoke screen, leaving Grogg captured and trapped where he was allegedly sent to Mars. Through unknown means he returned to Earth and was captured by S.H.I.E.L.D. where he was placed in that organization's Paranormal Containment Unit.

Groot

Groot is a floral colossus.

The original Groot is an alien conqueror that later appeared as a member of Nick Fury's Howling Commandos.

The second Groot is a member of the Guardians of the Galaxy.

Gruto
Gruto is a green alien gorilla-like monster that first appeared in Journey into Mystery #67 and was created by Stan Lee and Jack Kirby.

Gruto is a giant alien from the planet Pacion Rex that resembled a green scaly gorilla.

Hellcow

Hippo

Hiro-Kala

Hobgoblin

Holocaust

Hood

Hulk

Amadeus Cho

Guilt Hulk

Hulk 2099

Immortal Hulk/Devil Hulk

Maestro

Tyrone Cash

Ultimate Hulk

Insect Man
The Insect Man is a giant insect monster that first appeared in Tales of Suspense #24 and was created by Stan Lee and Jack Kirby.

The Insect Man and his kind reside in an unknown part of Subterranea where they once had an encounter with Sergeant Mason of the U.S. Army.

It the Living Colossus

It the Living Colossus is a 100-ft. statue that was brought to life by the Kigor.

Jack O'Lantern

Jackal

Juggernaut

Kindred

Kiwi Black

Klaatu

Klagg
Klagg is a giant monstrous alien with a tall head that first appeared in Tales of Suspense #21 and was created by Stan Lee and Jack Kirby.

Klagg is a peaceful alien who arrived on Earth where he planned to destroy it for its constant wars.

Komodo

Kool-Aid Man

Kraa the Unhuman
Kraa the Unhuman is a giant monster that first appeared in Tales of Suspense #18 and was created by Stan Lee and Jack Kirby.

Kraa was once a human of the Wabuzi tribe until he was mutated into a giant monster by the explosion of an atomic bomb caused by the Soviet Union soldiers.

Laufey

Leo

Lilith

Living Monolith

Lizard

Leader

Malekith the Accursed

Man-Beast

Man-Bull

Man-Elephant

Man-Thing

Man-Wolf

Mandrill

Manphibian

Mantis

Marrow

Megataur
Megataur is a giant Deviant Mutate that first appeared in Fantastic Four Unlimited #4 and was created by Roy Thomas, Herb Trimpe, and Steve Montano.

Megataur is a bull-headed Deviant Mutate that was a servant of the Mole Man where he fought Atalanta, Hulk, Human Torch, Invisible Woman, and Thing.

Megataur in other media
Megataur appears in The Super Hero Squad Show.

Metallo

Metallo is a gigantic high-tech armor that first appeared in Tales of Suspense #16 and was created by Stan Lee and Jack Kirby.

Metallo was a giant high-tech armor that was built to withstand radiation. The scientists that created it unknowingly allowed an escaped convict named Mike Fallon to test the armor.

Mechano
Mechano is a giant robot that first appeared in Strange Tales #86 and was created by Jack Kirby and Dick Ayes.

Mechano is a 30 ft. robot that was built by Mr. Hopkins and his young assistant Tommy Briggs that was brought to life by a malfunctioning transformer.

Mephisto

Miclas
Miclas is a monster that first appeared in Fantastic Four #347 and was created by Walt Simonson, Arthur Adams, and Eiji Tsuburaya.

Miclas is a giant monster that was among the monsters of Monster Isle that were captured by the Skrull.

Midgard Serpent

Mindless Ones

Minotaur

Missing Link

Mister Hyde

Mister Jip

Mojo

Molten Man-Thing
The Molten Man-Thing is a giant lava monster created by Stan Lee, Jack Kirby (pencils), and Steve Ditko (inker). He first appeared in Tales of Suspense #7 (1960). The Molten Man-Thing escaped from an erupting volcano on a South Pacific Island. The creature stumbled into a nearby village where he encountered Frank Harper, a vacationing pilot. Harper blasted him with cool air in a wind tunnel at a nearby airport. The Molten Man-Thing fell back into the volcano.

In Marvel Universe #4, Frank Harper was retconned into Makkari, one of the Eternals. It was also suggested there that the Molten Man-Thing was one of the Deviant mutates.

An enchanted paint duplicate of Molten Man-Thing later attacked New York.

Monster from Mars
The Monster from Mars is a creature from the film of the same name who first appeared in Fantastic Four #3 and was created by Stan Lee and Jack Kirby.

Miracle Man brought the giant display of the creature to life through hypnosis so that he can steal an atomic tank from the U.S. military and fight the Fantastic Four. The Monster from Mars display was destroyed by Human Torch.

Mongoose

Monsteroso

Monsteroso is the name of two giant monsters:

 The first one is a large alien child.
 The second one is a giant Sturdian that is found in the Microverse.

Monstro the Gorilla
Monstro the Gorilla is a giant white gorilla who resided on a small island somewhere off the coast of Africa and was trapped in a cave by the natives. Nobody knew it yet, but Monstro was blind because of it being trapped in a cave for a long time. First appeared Journey into Mystery #54.

Monstro the Octopus
Monstro the Octopus is a gigantic octopus that first appeared in Tales of Suspense #8 and was created by Stan Lee and Jack Kirby.

Not much is known about Monstro the Octopus other than the fact that it was suspected of being an octopus that was mutated through atomic weaponry. Following Monstro the Octopus' attack on a Soviet coastal town, Professor Mark Faraday was called in by the Soviet Diplomats to investigate Monstro the Octopus. Upon guessing the theory of its origins, Professor Mark Faraday was able to get it shrunken back down to its normal height in 24 hours.

Monstrom
Monstrom is a giant one-eyed alien that first appeared in Tales to Astonish #11 and was created by Jack Kirby and Dick Ayers.

Monstrom is a 20-ft, one-eyed alien whose spaceship crashed in the bayou 1,000 years ago. Unable to fix the spaceship himself, Monstrom placed himself in suspended animation. 1,000 years later, some humans exploring the bayou where a boy unknowingly awoken Monstrom who tried to speak to them. As Monstrom can only speak in monster sounds, the humans were unable to understand him. One person tried to shoot it with a rifle to no avail. When Monstrom later followed the people back to town, the townspeople discovered its fear of fire and drove him back to the bayou. Deeming the humans too barbaric to help him, Monstrom retreated back to his spaceship where he re-entered suspended animation until the day the humans would be advanced to help him.

Moomba
Moomba is a giant alien monster that first appeared in Tales to Astonish #23 and was created by Stan Lee and Jack Kirby.

Moomba is a 20 ft. alien monster from an unknown race that planned to conquer Earth and seeded themselves into wooden statues all over the world.

Moon-Boy

Morpheus

Mystique

N'astirh

N'Kantu, the Living Mummy

Necrom

Nekra

Nightcrawler

Nightmare

Ogre

Olivier

Oog
Oog is a giant alien monster that first appeared in Tales of Suspense #27 and was created by Jack Kirby.

Oog is a 25 ft. alien who was on his way from returning to his homeworld when his spaceship's engines failed and he crashed into Earth somewhere in the Arctic Circle. Before becoming frozen in ice, Oog etched a galactic distress signal. Some centuries later, Oog was found frozen in a block of ice by a scientific expedition who transported his frozen form back to the United States where he thaws. Oog accidentally broke the wall to the laboratory where some people mistook him for being on rampage enough to call in the army. Oog defended himself by hypnotizing the army. Displeased with how the humans reacted to him, Oog commented to the humans that they should be quarantined from the rest of outer space. As Oog signals his kind to come pick him up, they don't know the existence of the humans around their spaceship causing the humans to think that there are worst things in outer space.

Orb

Orrgo

Orrgo is a 25 ft. Mentelleronite.

Piranha

Pisces

Pixie

Plantman

Porcupine

Predator X

Proteus

Psyklop

Puff Adder

Puma

Rattler

Ravage

Razorback

Red Ghost

Red Hulk

Robert Maverick

Thunderbolt Ross

Red She-Hulk

Reptil

Rhino

Rock Python

Rockslide

Rommbu
Rommbu is a giant alien monster that first appeared in Tales to Astonish #19 and was created by Jack Kirby and Dick Ayers.

Rommbu is a giant alien who was dispatched by his kind to get Earth to surrender.

Rorgg
Rorgg is a giant alien spider monster that first appeared in Journey into Mystery #64 and was created by Stan Lee, Jack Kirby, and Dick Ayers.

Rorgg is the ruler of a race of giant alien spider monsters that sought to conquer Earth. Rorgg's kind had a weakness against DDT.

Rorgg in other media
Rorgg appears in Hulk: Where Monsters Dwell with its vocal effects provided by Jon Olson.

Sandman
The Sandman is an alien monster made of sand that first appeared in Journey into Mystery #70 and was created by Jack Kirby. This monster is not to be confused with the supervillain of the same name.

The alien Sandman crash-landed on Earth where he ended up in Mexico. The local tribespeople thought it was an evil spirit. They took him while he was still weak from his crash and sealed him in a cave with no air and light where he remained in a state of suspended animation. By the early 1960s, a vacationing Marine named Steve Bronson and his family accidentally unleashed the alien Sandman on the world. The alien Sandman regained its consciousness and recounted its past to the Bronson family and planned to conquer the Earth. Steve Bronson tried to oppose the alien Sandman, but it proved invulnerable to physical assault. The alien Sandman ordered the Bronsons to transport him to North America, so he could observe the most powerful nation on the planet before putting his plan into action. Steve Bronson was able to alert the military to the alien Sandman's presence, but they also proved ineffective in dealing with the extraterrestrial threat. Bullets went right through him, gas was ineffectual because he does not breathe and while bombs would scatter his pieces, he proved capable of reforming himself afterwards. The alien Sandman planned to increase its size by absorbing every sand on the beaches until nothing can stop him. Steve Bronson's son Bobby heard about the plan and headed to the beach with a plan of his own. Bobby threw a pile of water over the sand which made the alien Sandman soggy to the point where he couldn't move. The military quickly transported the alien Sandman's body to a top-secret underground facility where he has remained ever since.

Sabretooth

Sasquatch

Doc Sasquatch

Satana

Satannish

Sauron

Scarecrow

Scorpio

Scorpion

Shadow King

She-Hulk

Lyra

Shiklah

Shuma-Gorath

Sidewinder

Sin-Eater

Skaar

Skreeal
Skreel is a moth monster that first appeared in Fantastic Four #347 and was created by Walt Simonson.

Skreel is a giant moth monster that resides on Monster Isle and is named after the sounds it makes.

Skrull

Son of Satan

Sphinx

Spiral

Sporr
Sporr is a giant amoeba monster that first appeared in Tales of Suspense #11 and was created by Stan Lee and Jack Kirby.

Sporr is a giant amoeba monster created by a scientist that moved into Victor Frankenstein's castle where he used a growth ray on the amoeba.

Sporr in other media
Sporr appears in Hulk: Where Monsters Dwell where its vocal effects are provided by Jon Olson.

Spyke

Squid-Boy

Stacy X

Stegron the Dinosaur Man

Stilt-Man

Straw Man

Surtur

Swarm

Symbiote

Anti-Venom

Carnage

Hybrid

Mania

Scream

Toxin

Venom

Taskmaster

Taurus

Thing

She-Thing

Thing that Crawled By Night
The Thing that Crawled by Night is a giant plant monster that first appeared in Tales of Suspense #26 and was created by Stan Lee and Jack Kirby.

The Thing that Crawled by Night was a giant plant monster that was created by a farmer.

Tim Boo Ba
Tim Boo Ba first appeared in Amazing Adult Fantasy #9 (Feb. 1962). His story was later republished with entirely new illustrations in Silver Surfer #4 (Feb. 1968).

Tim Boo Ba is a reptilian humanoid from the microscopic planet Devoktos, and together with an army of mercenaries he decides to conquer the entire Microverse. Despite initial success, Tim Boo Ba and his forces are apparently wiped out by a flood, which is revealed to be nothing more than a drop of water from the considerably larger Earth-616, the mainstream Marvel Earth.

Tim Boo Ba apparently survives and years later tricks fellow monster Googam into using the scientific equipment of Mister Fantastic to enlarge him. Tim Boo Ba uses the equipment to grow to giant proportions, but is eventually stopped by Googam and fellow monsters Elektro, Gorgilla and Fin Fang Foom.

Toad

Tombstone

Torg
Torg the Abominable Snow-King is a giant sea-dwelling ape-like monster who first appeared in Sub-Mariner #55 and was created by Bill Everett.

Torg's origins are unknown as he claims that nobody knows his beginning and nobody knows his end. He caused trouble in the waters near Antarctica which attracted the attention of Namor who managed to defeat him with a block of ice.

Torg in other media
Torg appears in Lego Marvel Super Heroes 2. He appears as a boss in Lemuria where he is under the control of Attuma. The Avengers free him from Attuma's mind control. Torg then attacks Attuma and drags him down to the bottom of the sea.

Tricephalous

Tricephalous is a three-headed giant Deviant Mutate.

Troll

Trull the Unhuman
Trull the Unhuman is a non-corporal alien who first appeared in Tales to Astonish #21 and was created by Stan Lee and Jack Kirby.

When Trull's ship had crashed, his physical body was destroyed. His essence survived and had possessed a construction crew's steam shovel that was designed by a man named Phil. Trull went on a rampage upon holding Phil, his ex-girlfriend, her new boyfriend, and the construction foreman hostage. This lasted until an elephant that Phil freed earlier defeated it by cracking its body. Trull's essence escaped into the jungle.

During the Civil War II storyline, Trull the Unhuman resurfaced in a new steam shovel body where he vandalized Damage Control's equipment until he got busted by Damage Control worker Monstro. Upon Monstro empathizing him, Trull was convinced to give up on his goals. Trull the Unhuman joined up with Damage Control and became their spokesperson.

Two-Headed Thing
The Two-Headed Thing is a giant monster with two heads that first appeared in Strange Tales #95 and was created by Stan Lee, Jack Kirby, and Dick Ayers.

The Two-Headed Thing is an orange two-headed rock monster with super-strength and shapeshifting abilities.

Ulik

Ulvar
Ulvar is a giant alien that first appeared in Journey into Mystery #63.

Ulvar was a giant alien from Centaurus II that challenged Gigantus's supremacy. After Gigantus retreated, it turned out that Ulvar was a prop built by Mr. Baxter and Charlie to fool Gigantus.

Umar

Vampires

Baron Blood

Deacon Frost

Doctor Sun

Dracula

Hunger

Jubilee

Lilith

Morbius, the Living Vampire

Morlun

Saracen

Steppin' Razor

Vampire by Night

Varnae

Vandoom's Monster
Vandoom's Monster is a wax monster that first appeared in Tales to Astonish #17 and was created by Stan Lee, Jack Kirby, and Dick Ayers.

Ludwig Vandoom created a wax sculpture of a giant monster in order to improve his failing wax museum. The wax sculpture came to life upon being struck by lightning from a freak thunderstorm.

Vermin

Viper

Madam Hydra

Vulture

Walrus

Warlock

Warlord Kaa
Warlord Kaa is a giant shadow monster who first appeared in Strange Tales #79 and was created by Stan Lee and Jack Kirby.

Warlord Kaa is the leader of the Shadow Realm. He led his fellow shadow monsters into invading Earth until a mystery writer named Phillip Lawrence found out and alerted the United Nations of their invasion. The shadow monsters were captured, but Warlord Kaa escaped leaving a message in the sky vowing to return and succeed next time.

Warwolf

Weapon H

Werewolf by Night

Wendigo

White Tiger

Wild Child

Wolfsbane

Wolverine

Xemnu

Xemnu the Living Titan, also known as Xemnu the Hulk, is a fictional character appearing in American comic books published by Marvel Comics. Xemnu is an alien who has attempted to conquer the Earth several times. The character first appeared in the story "I Was a Slave of the Living Hulk!" in Journey into Mystery #62, and was created by Stan Lee and Jack Kirby.

Xemnu first appeared when his starship crash-landed on Earth after running out of fuel. When revived by the human Joe Harper, Xemnu reveals that he was a criminal who had been exiled into space for crimes against the rest of the universe, and had escaped a prison planet and fled to Earth. Xemnu then used telepathy to dominate Harper's mind and then the minds of every other human on Earth. He forced them to build him a new starship so that he could return home. As he departs, he releases Harper from his telepathic domination. Harper sabotages the ship's electrical systems, shocking Xemnu into a coma-like state. As the alien flew off, his mind control faded, and his former servants forgot that he had ever existed. Xemnu used telekinesis to direct an asteroid to strike his ship so that it would be knocked onto a course back to Earth. After crashing down on Earth a second time, the weakened Xemnu was taken into a circus sideshow. As he took control of the town where the circus was located, Joe Harper followed Xemnu's trail and confronts the alien. Xemnu attempts to disintegrate Harper, but Harper used a mirror to reflect the alien's psychic power back at it, and Xemnu's body was destroyed.

Xemnu then traveled through space in a non-corporeal form, and over the years learned that his home planet had been wiped out by a plague. He returned to Earth, possessing the body of an astronaut named Richmond Wagner to gain a physical form. When the space shuttle arrived on Earth, Xemnu used his human host's popularity and his own telepathy to become the host of a children's television series. He used his mental power to place Earth's children under his thrall, planning to abduct them to repopulate his home world, only to be detected by Doctor Strange. Strange and his ally Namor the Sub-Mariner were defeated by the alien, but Xemnu was in turn beaten by the Hulk. Xemnu then took possession of Amos Moses, mayor of small-town Plucketville, in an attempt to kidnap the townspeople of Plucketville to repopulate his home planet. The newly formed Defenders (Doctor Strange, the Hulk, the Sub-Mariner and the Valkyrie) fought him, thus preventing him from using the townspeople to construct another starship. Xemnu continued his vendetta against the Hulk via a series of clones created from samples of other "classic Marvel" alien monsters, sent to attack the Hulk, and battled the Hulk himself; however, he was defeated when the dam containing his hideout burst. Xemnu later used Amos Moses' body in an attempt to once again take control of the Earth via television-transmitted hypnosis. Xemnu took mental control of the Los Angeles-based hero Wonder Man using him to attack his ally, the Thing. The heroes eventually defeated Xemnu, and he fled in a starship.

Later, deep in space, Xemnu infiltrates the spacecraft-haulage craft owned by Ulysses Solomon Archer. He takes over the enclosed area of the Star Stop Diner and confronts a pregnant woman known as Mary McGrill. He plans to genetically alter her child to make it one of his own race. He is opposed by Razorback, Archer, the She-Hulk and everyone else at the diner, but they are easily knocked out by his psychic powers. The She-Hulk awakens ahead of the others and finds that Xemnu is attempting to turn her into a "She-Xemnu." Ultimately, Xemnu is defeated and given over to a powerful humanoid alien named Big Enilwen. This childlike being believes that Xemnu is simply a teddy bear to play with.

Xemnu convinces Enilwen to free his teddy bear population to 'the wild'. He returns to confront the She-Hulk again, this time to sell her into slavery. This time he is defeated by a large monkey wrench to the head, wielded by the She-Hulk's friend Louise Mason.

Xemnu reappeared as one of the Space Phantom's kidnapped bodies in Beyond!. He appeared in Annihilation: Conquest as one of the Phalanx select.

Xemnu later returned to Earth and fought the Red Hulk after Woodgod's defeat. During that time, the Impossible Man uses his magic to combine the Hulk and the Red Hulk into the Compound Hulk, which fights Xemnu's minion Kluh (a smart version of the Gray Hulk) and overpowers it.

Xemnu later appeared on Monster Isle when Shadowcat and Magik appeared to look for a mutant girl named Bo. Xemnu was among the monsters that attacked the three until Magik teleported herself, Shadowcat, and Bo to the Jean Grey School for Higher Learning.

Xemnu later appears alongside Rocket Raccoon.

During the "Monsters Unleashed" storyline, Xemnu is among the monsters seen falling from the sky near San Diego.

Xenmu appears again, currently living on Monster Isle. He is approached by Roxxon CEO Dario Agger as part of his plan to ruin the Hulk's public image and replace him with his own Hulk. Augmented with cybernetics, Xenmu appears to save citizens from several giant internal parasites that the Hulk accidentally unleashed which led to his Devil Hulk persona changing to the Savage Hulk persona. Knowing that the media is watching, Xenmu uses his powers to subtly take control of the viewers by asking if they remember him. While this is going on, he allows the Hulk to fight him so that he can purposely lose control of the parasites to worsen the Hulk's public image. After being saved by the Absorbing Man, the Hulk leaves as Xenmu's powers have begun to influence those who witnessed the event on screen, as shown with one of the Hulk's current allies, Dr. Charlene McGowan, whose recount of meeting Daredevil for the first time was now changed to meeting Xenmu. In Bruce Banner's mind, the Savage Hulk persona comments that he cannot fight Xemnu's hypnosis. The Green Scar persona reappears and states that he can. Minotaur discovered Xemnu had transformed the people he fed on into Xemnu/human hybrid minions. Upon objecting to this, Xemnu consumed Minotaur and transformed him into a deformed Xemnu/Minotaur hybrid creature unable to speak. The Hulk in his Green Scar persona managed to slay Xemnu enough to break the mind control.

Xemnu in other media
Xemnu appears in the Hulk and the Agents of S.M.A.S.H. episode, "The Strongest One There Is", voiced by Fred Tatasciore. This version is much taller and stronger than the Hulk. He is interested in challenging local fighters and delivers a challenge, via hologram, to fight the Hulks - all except Rick. Seeing it as pointless, the Hulk moves to reject but Rick accepts on behalf of the entire team. His colleagues lose. Feeling guilty, Rick tries one more time and manages to defeat Xemnu. Xemnu declares his journey for a skilled fight over and bonds with Rick over video games and doughnuts.

Six years after the release of the original comic, the fictitious alien Xemnu (under the barely altered name Xenu or Xemu) would become a central part of the secret teachings of the new religion of Scientology. Due to L. Ron Hubbard's heavy drinking and drug use at the time, Hubbard may not even have been aware that he was appropriating a Marvel comic book villain to flesh out his scriptures.

Yetrigar

Yetrigar is a Sasquatch-like being created by writer Doug Moench and artist Herb Trimpe as an adversary for Godzilla in Marvel Comics. He first appeared in Godzilla #10, where he had grown to gargantuan proportions due to being exposed to radiation. His name comes from the legendary shaggy men that some believe live in the Japanese mountains.

Yetrigar battles Godzilla in the Grand Canyon. In his encounter with Godzilla, Yetrigar proves more than a match for the legendary 'King of the Monsters' and could have perhaps even killed Godzilla had Red Ronin not interceded. Initially, Robert tries to prevent both entities from harming each other but ultimately buries Yetrigar beneath a rockslide. Ashamed of this action, Takiguchi temporarily fled in the Red Ronin robot.

Attempting to get revenge on Phantom Rider, Mockingbird led the West Coast Avengers to the Grand Canyon where Hamilton Slade was working on an archaeological project. To distract her teammates while she looked for Hamilton Slade, Mockingbird set up explosives which freed Yetrigar. The Avengers' attacks on the beast proved very futile until Hank Pym placed an object in Yetrigar's ear and used the Pym Particles to enlarge the device enough to knock him unconscious.

After his defeat at the hands of the Avengers, Yetrigar was remanded to the Vault. In a prologue to Acts of Vengeance, Yetrigar was seen trying to break out of his energy cell during a mass-prison break. This was thwarted by Hawkeye and Iron Man who managed to trap the other villains (namely Angar the Screamer, Cactus, Electro, Griffin, Hydro-Man, Klaw, Mister Hyde, Orka, Scarecrow, Titania, and Whirlwind) that were trying to escape.

After the Vault was shut down, Yetrigar was taken someplace else. It is most likely that he was placed on Monster Isle.

Ymir

Zarathos

Zetora
Zetora is a giant monstrous Martian that first appeared in Journey into Mystery #57 and was created by Jack Kirby and Dick Ayers.

Zetora was a giant Martian criminal who fled to Earth after committing a crime on Mars.

Zombie

Zzutak
Zzutak is a giant monster that first appeared in Strange Tales #88 and was created by Stan Lee, Jack Kirby, and Steve Ditko.

Zzutak is an orange monster that was painted to life on an Aztec canvas by comic book illustrator Frank Johnson upon being manipulated by an Aztec tribe.

Zzutak in other media
Zzutak appears in Hulk: Where Monsters Dwell with its vocal effects provided by Jon Olson.

Zzzax

References

External links
 Marvel Comics Monsters at Comic Vine

monsters in Marvel Comics, List of
Fictional monsters
Kaiju